Walter Leigh (22 June 190512 June 1942) was an English composer. Leigh is best known for his Concertino for harpsichord and string orchestra, written in 1934. Other famous works include the overture Agincourt and The Frogs of Aristophanes for chorus and orchestra.  He wrote music for documentary films and there is an unfinished sketch for a symphony.

Career
Walter Leigh was born in Wimbledon.  His first teacher was Harold Darke, with whom he worked from the age of eight until he was seventeen. He went to Christ's College, Cambridge, studying composition with Cyril Rootham and graduating in 1926. For two years thereafter, he studied composition under Paul Hindemith at the Berlin Hochschule für Musik.

In 1930, Leigh declined a teaching job and set about earning a living by accepting small commissions and becoming increasingly involved with the theatre. With V.C. Clinton-Baddeley he wrote a pantomime for the Festival Theatre at Cambridge, and two comic operas, the second of which, Jolly Roger, ran for six months at the Savoy Theatre in London, with a cast headed by George Robey. He composed an elaborate score for Basil Wright's documentary film The Song of Ceylon and the concert overture Agincourt, commissioned by the BBC in celebration of King George V's Silver Jubilee. The Harpsichord Concertino is one of a number of chamber works of the period: an elegant and concise work, more French than German in its spare-noted neo-classicism, the keyboard writing showing signs of Ravel's influence.

For the Cambridge production of The Frogs in 1936, Leigh produced another score precision-made for the occasion. The music for A Midsummer Night's Dream was written for an open-air schools performance at Weimar in 1936; it is scored for flute, clarinet, trumpet, strings and harpsichord. Music for String Orchestra is a work written sympathetically for amateurs in four movements: Adagio – Vivo – Lento – Allegro. The only other major commission Leigh undertook before the outbreak of war was to produce the music for Herbert Farjeon's intimate revue Nine Sharp (1938).

He was a composer who thrived on limitations and who needed the right external stimulus if he was to produce his best work. He was a craftsman-composer of a type more common in the 18th century than the 20th century. Almost all his music was written for immediate use; like Haydn, he would not have fulfilled a commission without ascertaining the probable capabilities of his performers; he could turn to any number of different idioms according to the needs of the occasion.

An obituary in The Times credits Leigh as being "the first British composer to undertake a complete study of the many problems relating to the sound-track in the production of films", and cites the score for The Song of Ceylon as "a classic example of the creative use of music and sound in relation to the visuals on the screen."

The majority of the orchestral and chamber works have been recorded on the Lyrita and Dutton Epoch labels. The piano music and some art songs were recorded on the Tremula label. The Harpsichord Concertino was recorded by Kathleen Long in 1946 using a piano.

In 1941, during the Second World War, he joined the British Army and served as a trooper with the Royal Armoured Corps, 4th Queen's Own Hussars. He was killed in action near Tobruk, Libya in 1942, just before his 37th birthday, leaving a widow, Marion, and three children, Julian, Veronica and Andrew, who had been sent to Canada to escape the London Blitz.

Compositions
Stage
 Aladdin, or Love Will Find Out the Way (1931); pantomime
 The Pride of the Regiment, or Cashiered for His Country (1932); comic operetta; book by Scobie Mackenzie and V.C. Clinton-Baddeley
 Jolly Roger, or The Admiral's Daughter (1933); comic opera in 3 Acts; book by Scobie Mackenzie and V.C. Clinton-Baddeley; premièred at the Savoy Theatre
 Victoria Regina (1935); premièred at the Broadhurst Theatre on Broadway
 Nine Sharp (1938); musical revue
 The Little Revue (1939)

Incidental music
 Charlemagne (1935); music for the radio play 
 The Frogs (1936); incidental music for the play by Aristophanes; Oxford University Press
 A Midsummer Night's Dream (1936); incidental music for the William Shakespeare comedy

Orchestra
 Music for String Orchestra (1931); Wilhelm Hansen Verlag; Kalmus Music
 Three Pieces for Amateur Orchestra (1929)
 Agincourt, "Jubilee Overture" for Orchestra (1935); Oxford University Press

Concertante
 Concertino for Harpsichord (or Piano) and String Orchestra (1934); Oxford University Press; Kalmus Music

Chamber music
 Reverie for Violin and Piano (1922)
 Romance for 2 Violins, Viola, Cello and Piano
 Student String Quartet (1929)
 Three Movements for String Quartet (1929); Wilhelm Hansen Verlag
 Sonatina for Viola and Piano (1930); Comus Edition
 Trio for Flute, Oboe and Piano (1935); Oxford University Press
 Sonatina for Treble Recorder (or Flute) and Piano (1939); Edition Schott
 Air for Treble Recorder and Piano; Forsyth Brothers Ltd.

Piano
 Music for Three Pianos (1932) 
 Eclogue for Piano (1940); Banks Music Publication
 Three Waltzes for 2 Pianos
 Polka for Piano
 Five Playtime Pieces; Animus Music Publishing
 Piano Album for Piano (1929)

 Vocal
 Peculiar Noises for Voice and Piano (1938); words by Herbert Farjeon

 Film music
 His Lordship (1932)
 The Song of Ceylon (1934)
 Pett and Pott: A Fairy Story of the Suburbs (1934)
 The Face of Scotland (1938)
 Man of the Alps (1939)
 Squadron 992 (1939)
 Table d'Hote (1939); for television
 The Fourth Estate: A Film of a British Newspaper (1940)

References

Jack Westrup/Kenrick Dance: 'Leigh, Walter', Grove Music Online, ed. L. Macy (Accessed 23 November 2006), grovemusic.com
Hugo Cole; notes to recording: Lyrita SRCS. 126.

External links

Walter Leigh: directory of manuscripts
Oxford University Press: Walter Leigh
Article by Jamie Sexton on Basil Wright & Walter Leigh's use of sound in the film Song of Ceylon

1905 births
1942 deaths
20th-century classical composers
20th-century English composers
English male classical composers
Pupils of Paul Hindemith
Light music composers
20th-century British male musicians
Military personnel from London
Royal Armoured Corps soldiers
4th Queen's Own Hussars soldiers
British Army personnel killed in World War II